In enzymology, a (S)-limonene 7-monooxygenase is an enzyme that catalyzes the chemical reaction

(-)-(S)-limonene + NADPH + H + O  (-)-perillyl alcohol + NADP + HO

The 4 substrates of this enzyme are (-)-(S)-limonene, NADPH, H, and O, whereas its 3 products are (-)-perillyl alcohol, NADP, and HO.

This enzyme belongs to the family of oxidoreductases, specifically those acting on paired donors, with O2 as oxidant and incorporation or reduction of oxygen. The oxygen incorporated need not be derived from O2 with NADH or NADPH as one donor, and incorporation of one atom o oxygen into the other donor.  The systematic name of this enzyme class is (S)-limonene,NADPH:oxygen oxidoreductase (7-hydroxylating). Other names in common use include (-)-limonene 7-monooxygenase, (-)-limonene hydroxylase, (-)-limonene monooxygenase, and (-)-limonene,NADPH:oxygen oxidoreductase (7-hydroxylating).  This enzyme participates in monoterpenoid biosynthesis and limonene and pinene degradation.  It employs one cofactor, heme.

References

 

EC 1.14.13
NADPH-dependent enzymes
Heme enzymes
Enzymes of unknown structure